Fraseria is a genus of passerine birds in the Old World flycatcher family Muscicapidae. 
It contains the following species:
 Fraser's forest flycatcher (Fraseria ocreata)
 White-browed forest flycatcher (Fraseria cinerascens)

References

 Del Hoyo, J.; Elliot, A. & Christie D. (editors). (2006). Handbook of the Birds of the World. Volume 11: Old World Flycatchers to Old World Warblers. Lynx Edicions. .

 
Bird genera
Taxa named by Charles Lucien Bonaparte
Taxonomy articles created by Polbot